Philipp Jakob von Scheffauer (7 May 1756, Stuttgart - 13 November 1808, Stuttgart) was a German Neoclassical sculptor.

Life and work 

His father was a manservant to Charles Eugene, Duke of Württemberg. In 1780, after studying at the Hohe Karlsschule, he and his fellow student, Johann Heinrich von Dannecker, were appointed Court Sculptors. Three years later, they were both sent to Paris and Rome for further studies; returning to Stuttgart in 1789. The following year, he and Dannecker became Professors at the Karlsschule, where they both remained until its closure in 1794. 

During this time, he was also awarded the Order of the Württemberg Crown, which entitled him to use the noble "von". In 1790, he married , better known as "Caroline H.", the subject of one of the first clinical descriptions of a "split-personality".

His health was always rather poor, and he died after a long illness, possibly from tuberculosis.

His "Crying Genius" is installed at the Stuttgart .

The  (Monument to the tenderness of the spouse and the love of the people), which was built in 1796 to celebrate the recovery of Frederick II Eugene, Duke of Württemberg from a serious illness, contained four large reliefs by Scheffauer. It was destroyed in 1817, when the square where it was displayed was redesigned.

References

Further reading 
 Julius Fekete: "Der Bildhauer Philipp Jakob Scheffauer (1756-1808). Ein weiterer Beitrag zum Werk". In: Jahrbuch der Staatlichen Kunstsammlungen in Baden-Württemberg, Vol. 47 (2010), pg.80ff.
 Georg Kaspar Nagler: Neues allgemeines Künstler-Lexicon, oder, Nachrichten von dem Leben und den Werken der Maler, Bildhauer, Baumeister, Kupferstecher, Formschneider, Lithographen, Zeichner, Medailleure, Elfenbeinarbeiter. Band 15. Fleischmann, München 1845, S. 158 f..

External links 

1756 births
1808 deaths
German sculptors
Reliefs in Germany
Busts in Germany
Artists from Stuttgart